Mega or MEGA may refer to:

Science 
 mega-, a metric prefix denoting 106
 Mega (number), a certain very large integer in Steinhaus–Moser notation
 "mega-" a prefix meaning "large" that is used in taxonomy
 Gravity assist, for Moon-Earth gravity assist and Mars-Earth gravity assist

Business 
 Aixam-Mega, a French automobile manufacturer based in Aix-les-Bains, Savoie
 Megaupload, a file sharing site seized by the FBI
 Mega (service), a cloud storage and file hosting service
 Mega Aircompany, a charter airline based in Almaty, Kazakhstan
 Mega Enterprise, a South Korean company that specialises in developing games
 MEGA International Srl., a French software company
 Mega Maldives, a Maldivian airline

Music 
 Mega (Yacht album), 2005
 Mega (Blank Banshee album), 2016
 Mega Records, a US record label
 Mega Records, former name of Danish record company Edel-Mega Records

Radio 
 MEGA (radio station), a Belarusian Internet radio station
 KLOL (Mega 101), a Spanish radio station in Houston
 KXOL-FM (Mega 96.3), a Spanish radio station in Los Angeles
 WSKQ-FM (Mega 97.9), a Spanish radio station in New York City
 WMEG (Mega 106.9), a Spanish radio station in Puerto Rico

People 
 Megawati Sukarnoputri (born 1947), former Indonesian president
 Ram Charan Teja (born 1985), Indian actor; sometimes nicknamed Mega Power Star
 Mega (wrestler), ring name of Cesar Caballero
 Mega Banton (born 1973), Jamaican dancehall deejay
 Christopher J. Mega (1930–2011), New York politician and judge
 Vordul Mega (born 1979), American rapper

Places 
 Mega, Ethiopia, a town in Ethiopia
 Mega, Indonesia, a town in Western New Guinea, Indonesia

Technology 
 Molecular Evolutionary Genetics Analysis, molecular biology software 
 Middle Eastern Geodatabase for Antiquities (MEGA), geographic information system 
 Mega (NES peripheral), a programmable controller for the Nintendo Entertainment System
 Samsung Galaxy Mega, an Android smartphone/tablet computer hybrid
 Mega Drive, a 16 bit game console created by Sega
 MEGA, the Mechanical Engineering Graduate Association at the Ohio State University College of Engineering

Television 
 Mega (Chilean television channel), the first private television channel of Chile
 Mega (Spanish television channel), a Spanish private television channel owned of Atresmedia
 Mega (Ukrainian television channel), a television channel in Ukraine
 Mega Channel, the Greek language terrestrial station of Greece and Cyprus
 Mega64, a low-budget series of comedy skits centered on video games
 "Mega", episode 18 of Law & Order season 10

Other uses 
 Mega (magazine), a defunct British video game magazine
 Mega, a character from The Tribe
 Mega Millions, a major jackpot game in the U.S.
 MEGA Family Shopping Centre, a network of shopping malls in Russia operated by IKEA
 MEGA Esports, a professional esports organization based in Bangkok, Thailand
 Marx-Engels-Gesamtausgabe, the complete works of Marx and Engels in German
 Metro-Link Express for Gandhinagar and Ahmedabad
 Mega Society, a high IQ society
 Megatall, a skyscraper taller than

See also 

 La Mega (disambiguation)
 Maga (disambiguation)
 Megabus (disambiguation)
 Mega Man (disambiguation)
 Mega TV (disambiguation)
 Megha (disambiguation)
 Meg (disambiguation)